Francis Carr may refer to:

 Francis Carr (District of Maine politician) (1751–1821), U.S. Representative from the District of Maine
 Francis Carr (Ohio politician) (1927–1993), member of the Ohio House of Representatives
 Francis Carr (footballer) (born 1979), Liberian footballer
 Francis Carr, voice actor from Happy Tree Friends

See also
 Frances Carr (1590–1632), English noblewoman
Frank Carr (disambiguation)